The First Battle of Jenné was a military engagement between the armies of the Tukulor Empire and the French Third Republic.  French forces under the command of Lieutenant Colonel Louis Archinard seized the capital of Ahmadu Tall on the Bani River. The engagement was hard fought and the results uncertain “until the last hour” according to French sources. Almami Ahmadu was forced to withdraw, and Umar Tall’s son Agibu was placed on the throne as a puppet ruler.

See also
Second Battle of Jenne
Tukulor Empire
History of Mali

References

Sources

Conflicts in 1891
Battles involving France
February 1891 events
Toucouleur Empire
19th-century military history of France